Taranagar is a city and municipality.

Taranagar may also refer to:

Taranagar, Jaynagar
Taranagar (Rajasthan Assembly constituency)

See also
Tara Nagar, village in Nepal